Seneca Senior High School is a high school in Seneca, South Carolina.

Notable Alumni 
Jimmy Orr, NFL Wide Receiver
Bennie Cunningham, NFL Tight End and two-time First Team All-American
Tommy Shaver, Liaison to the American Embassy in Mexico City, Football Coach at Southern Wesleyan University 
Willie Aikens, MLB First Baseman
John Wilson, USL soccer Left Back
Brad Glenn, Football Coach at Virginia Tech

References

Public high schools in South Carolina
Schools in Oconee County, South Carolina
Seneca, South Carolina